Philip Miles may refer to:

 Sir Philip Miles, 2nd Baronet (1825–1888), English politician
 Philip Napier Miles (1865–1935), British composer and philanthropist
 Philip John Miles, British Member of Parliament for Bristol, Westbury and Corfe Castle
 Philip William Skinner Miles, British Member of Parliament for Bristol
 Sir Philip John Miles, 7th Baronet (born 1953), of the Miles baronets
 Philip Miles (Indian Army officer) (1864–1948), British officer of the Indian Army
 Philip Miles (cricketer) (1848–1933), English army officer and cricketer